is a Japanese voice actor.

Filmography

Anime

Film

Video games

Dubbing

References

External links
 Official agency profile 
 

1959 births
Living people
Japanese male video game actors
Japanese male voice actors
Male voice actors from Miyagi Prefecture
Production Baobab voice actors
20th-century Japanese male actors
21st-century Japanese male actors